Sparksville may refer to:

Sparksville, Indiana
Sparksville, Kentucky

Fictional Places 
An episode of Ben 10 takes place in Sparksville.